Sorri is a surname. Notable people with the surname include:

 Kari Juhani Sorri (born 1941), Finnish chess master
 Maini Sorri (born 1957), Swedish–Finnish singer, musician, and songwriter
 Pietro Sorri (1558-1622), Italian painter

See also
 Zorri